Lepechinia paniculata is a species of flowering plant in the family Lamiaceae. It is endemic to Ecuador, where its natural habitat is subtropical or tropical moist montane forests.

References

paniculata
Endemic flora of Ecuador
Vulnerable plants
Taxonomy articles created by Polbot